Digital Opportunity Trust (DOT) is a Canadian charitable organization and social enterprise that provides technology, entrepreneurship and leadership training programs for young people in East Africa, the Middle East, Latin America, and Canada. The organization's headquarters are in Ottawa, Ontario, with local operations around the globe. Since the organization was founded in 2001, DOT has directly affected more than 6,000 young people worldwide, who have gone on to reach over 1 million of their fellow community members. More than 90% of alumni go on to either secure employment or start their own businesses within six months of completing DOT programming.

DOT’s stated mission is "to create a youth-led movement of daring social innovators who have the tools, knowledge and networks to create opportunities and transform their own communities".

The DOT model 
DOT operates under a youth-leading-youth model. Each of its economic, education and leadership programs are facilitated by recent graduates from the local area. Those team members are called DOT Interns. Interns go through a month-long training process where they learn writing, collaboration, facilitation and coaching skills. They then offer DOT's signature programs at partner organizations across their country. Each DOT Intern is projected to affect 200 of their peers.

DOT's programs include:
ReachUp! - an economic program that trains university and college graduates to deliver technology, business, and workforce readiness skills 
StartUp! - an entrepreneurship program that addresses the business and technology skills needed to scale already existing businesses and to create sustainable, customer-centric small and medium-sized enterprises
TeachUp! - an information and communications technology program that places young university graduates in schools to guide and assist teachers with integrating technology into their classrooms. TeachUp! is offered in Lebanon and Mexico
IBM's Corporate Service Corps program - Since 2008, DOT has been working with IBM to implement its employee leadership and global citizenship program. IBM Corporate Service Corps deploys IBM employees to countries around the world to help solve local challenges and build leadership skills of the employees and the community members. As one of four international partners, DOT co-ordinates IBM employees assigned to 11 countries around the world, including China, Turkey, Egypt and Kenya.

Leadership 
DOT's president and CEO is Janet Longmore, who has been recognized as a leading social entrepreneur. In 2013, she was named a Social Entrepreneur of the Year by the Schwab Foundation for Social Entrepreneurship, becoming only the second Canadian to win the award. She has also been named a senior fellow with Ashoka Canada for her leadership at DOT. Longmore is a member of the World Economic Forum.

David Johnston, a former Governor General of Canada, was DOT's first chair of the board of directors, a role he held during his time as the president of the University of Waterloo. The current chairman of the board is Patrick Gossage, who served as press secretary to former Canadian Prime Minister Pierre Elliott Trudeau.

Expansion 
Indigenous Canada
In fall 2014, DOT launched ReachUp! North, its first program in Canada targeted at Indigenous youth. The program adapts DOT's international ReachUp! program to meet the unique needs of First Nations, Métis and Inuit youth in Ottawa, and adds a cultural component to the workplace and digital skills training. The program is meant to help counter higher-than-average rates of unemployment among Aboriginal youth in Canada.

EthiopiaDuring 2023 funding from the Government of Canada was in support of youth employment programming in urban Ethiopia. The $10 million contribution aims to build the entrepreneurship and business skills of 75,000 young people in the country by 2018. The grant will also help DOT Ethiopia establish a series of business development service centers in Addis Ababa, Hawassa and Mekele.

Youth-Led Enterprise and Development Program
The Department of Foreign Affairs, Trade and Development Canada has also supported DOT through its Youth-Led Enterprise and Development Program. The current $6.9 million contribution is projected to help 88,000 young African women and men in Kenya, Rwanda, Ethiopia, Tanzania and Uganda.

West Africa 
In October 2014, DOT received a grant from The Rockefeller Foundation in order to determine the feasibility of its model "to address digital skills development and job placement for high potential, disadvantaged youth in Ghana". The grant is part of The Rockefeller Foundation’s Digital Jobs Africa Initiative.

References 

Educational organizations based in Ontario
International development in Africa
Development charities based in Canada